Kim Strauss is an American voice actor and best-selling author with his children's book Kalan the Mighty Warrior: Book One – Braxus the Owl: Guardian of the Forest And He is The Voice of Ninjor in Mighty Morphin Power Rangers"

History
He is also known for doing many voice roles throughout the history of the Power Rangers franchise; the more notable roles include Ninjor in Season 3 of Mighty Morphin' Power Rangers, Scorpius in Power Rangers: Lost Galaxy, and Jinxer in Power Rangers: Lightspeed Rescue. He has also enjoyed recurring acting roles on popular television series such as The Young and the Restless and Babylon 5.

Filmography

Anime
 Bleach Since 2004 – Sajin Komamura (until Ep. 99), Kaien Shiba, Tatsufusa Enjōji, Oscar Joaquin de la Rosa, Jūshirō Ukitake (Ep. 40)
 Blue Dragon – General Szabo
 The Big O – R. Frederick O'Reilly
 Cagaster of an Insect Cage – Mario
 Dinozaurs – Dino Tyranno
 Eureka Seven – Dewey Novak
 Fafner in the Azure – Tomatsu Kōdate 
 Flint the Time Detective – The Old Timer, Elfin
 Ghost in the Shell: Stand Alone Complex – Gayle (Eps. 20–21)
 Grenadier - The Senshi of Smiles – Jester Kaizan Doushi
 Immortal Grand Prix – Sir Hamgra
 Japan Sinks: 2020 – Saburō Ōtani
 Karas – Nurse
 Mars Daybreak – Grandpa
 Naruto – Ibiki Morino
 Overman King Gainer – Ariel
 Rurouni Kenshin – Tsukioka Tsunan
 Samurai Champloo – Mukuro
 Scrapped Princess – Lenard
 Tenchi Muyo! GXP – Tarant Shank
 Tenchi Muyo! Ryo-Ohki –  Sorunāru, Additional Voices
 Tenjou Tenge – Mitsuomi Takayanagi
 Transformers: Robots in Disguise – Ultra Magnus
 Mirage of Blaze – Masamune Date
 The Twelve Kingdoms – Keiki

Western animation
 The Casagrandes – Trailer Narrator, Voice Over, Food Critic (in "Guess Who's Shopping for Dinner?")

Video games
 Blue Dragon – Silent Ku, Guru-Guru, Pachess Townperson
 Doom Eternal – UAC Cultist, Battlemode Announcer
 Ghost in the Shell: Stand Alone Complex – Eichi Gotoh
 Grand Theft Auto V – The Local Population
 Naruto: Ultimate Ninja – Tazuna

Live-action
 Adventures in Voice Acting – Himself
 Babylon 5 – Additional Roles
 ER – Ari
 Masked Rider – Water Bug (voice), Masked Rider Warrior Leader (voice)
 Mighty Morphin Power Rangers – Harvey Garvey, Ninjor (voice; credited as Kurt Strauss)
 Power Rangers Zeo - Auric the Conqueror (uncredited)
 Million Dollar Baby - Irish Fan #3
 Power Rangers Wild Force – Lawnmower Org (voice), Rofang (voice)
 Power Rangers Time Force – Tronicon (voice), Venomark (voice)
 Power Rangers Lightspeed Rescue – Jinxer (voice), Magmavore (1st voice), Vilevine (voice)
 Power Rangers Lost Galaxy – Scorpius (voice), Teksa (1st voice), Decibat (voice)
 Power Rangers in Space – Clawhammer, Barillian Bug Monster (voice, uncredited)
 The Young and the Restless'' - Dr. Reese Walker

References

External links
Kim Strauss's Official Website

Living people
American children's writers
American male soap opera actors
American male television actors
American male video game actors
American male voice actors
Male actors from Chicago
20th-century American male actors
21st-century American male actors
Year of birth missing (living people)